Yianna Terzi (born Ioanna Terzi [] on 1 December 1980) is a Greek singer and songwriter. She represented Greece in the Eurovision Song Contest 2018 with the song "Oniro mou".

Biography
Terzi was born in 1980 in Thessaloniki, the daughter of Greek singer Paschalis Terzis. At age 20, she moved to Athens to pursue a music career, releasing her first CD single in 2005, and the album Gyrna to kleidi in 2006 through Cobalt Music. She then signed to Minos EMI and released the album  in 2008 along with a single of the same name. Terzi later moved to the United States and worked as a talent scout for Interscope Records.

Terzi was selected as one of the twenty shortlisted artists for the Ellinikós Telikós 2018 with the song "Oniro mou" on 27 October 2017, representing Panik Records. Later, on 8 November, she became one of the five acts to be selected to move on to the televised final. Following the disqualification of two of the five acts for not having a "Greek sound", "Oniro mou" entered the top three. On 15 February 2018, it was reported that the record labels for the two other competing artists refused to pay a €20,000 fee to the Greek broadcaster Hellenic Broadcasting Corporation (ERT) and were disqualified from the competition, leaving "Oniro mou" as the only song remaining and the default Greek entry. At the contest, held on 8 May 2018, she placed 14th, failing to qualify for the final. Following the competition, the English version of the song, titled "Eternity" was released.

Discography

Studio albums

Singles

References

1980 births
Eurovision Song Contest entrants of 2018
Greek laïko singers
Eurovision Song Contest entrants for Greece
Greek expatriates in the United States
21st-century Greek women singers
Greek pop singers
Living people
Minos EMI artists
Panik Records artists
Singers from Thessaloniki
Universal Music Greece artists